Marquis Xian may refer to:

Marquis Xian of Jin (died 812 BC)
Marquess Xian of Zhao (died 409 BC)
Chen Ping (Han dynasty) (died 178 BC)